The 2001 European Promotion Cup for Junior Men was the third edition of the basketball European Promotion Cup for U18 men's teams, today known as FIBA U18 European Championship Division C. It was played in Valletta, Malta, from 11 to 15 July 2001. Cyprus men's national under-18 basketball team won the tournament.

Participating teams

First round
In the first round, the teams were drawn into two groups. The first two teams from each group will advance to the semifinals, the other teams will play in the 5th–7th place classification.

Group A

Group B

5th–7th place classification

Championship playoffs

Semifinals

Third place match

Final

Final standings

References

FIBA U18 European Championship Division C
2001–02 in European basketball
FIBA U18
International basketball competitions hosted by Malta
FIBA